St Georges Basin is an open intermediate estuary, or inland sea, located in the South Coast region of New South Wales, adjacent to the Jervis Bay Territory.

Location and features
St Georges Basin is a coastal waterbody located immediately adjacent to the Tasman Sea of the South Pacific Ocean, north of the town of Sussex Inlet and east of the town of St Georges Basin. The basin is fed by  Wandandian Creek and Tomerong Creek and its primary outflow is to the Tasman Sea via the Sussex Inlet.

History
The traditional custodians of the land surrounding St Georges Basin were the Indigenous Australian Yuin people, who named the basin as Bherwherrae or Bherwherree.

European surveyor Thomas Florance renamed the body of water as St Georges Basin on 29 November 1827, while tracing from Jervis Bay to Conjola.

See also

 List of lakes of Australia

References

External links
 

Lakes of New South Wales
Coastline of New South Wales
South Coast (New South Wales)
City of Shoalhaven